Amyntas III was king of the ancient Greek kingdom of Macedonia from 393/2 to 388/7 BC and again from 387/6 to 370 BC. He was a member of the Argead dynasty through his father Arrhidaeus, grandson of Amyntas, one of the sons of Alexander I. His most famous son is Philip II, father of Alexander the Great.

Family 
Polygamy was used by Macedonian kings both before and after Amyntas to secure marriage alliances and produce enough heirs to offset losses from intra-dynastic conflict. Consequently, Amyntas took two wives: Eurydice and Gygaea. He first married the former, daughter of the Lyncestian-Illyrian Sirras, by 390 BC and possibly in the aftermath of an Illyrian invasion. Through Eurydice, Amyntas had three sons, all of whom became kings of Macedonia one after the other, and a daughter: Alexander II, Perdiccas III, Philip II, and Eurynoe.

The Roman historian Justin relates several, possibly apocryphal, stories about Eurydice and Eurynoe. He claims that Eurynoe prevented her mother and her lover (unnamed, but likely Ptolemy of Aloros) from assassinating Amyntas late in his reign by revealing the plan to her father. However, Eurynoe is not referred to by name in any other source and, moreover, is unlikely to have known the details of this supposedly secret plot. According to Justin, Amyntas spared Eurydice because they shared children, but that she would later help murder Alexander and Perdiccas in order to place Ptolemy on the throne. Alexander was in fact killed by friends of Ptolemy at a festival in 368, but the extent to which Eurydice knew of or participated in this plot is opaque. Perdiccas, on the other hand, assassinated Ptolemy in 365 only to be killed in battle by the Illyrians in 359.

Amyntas most likely married Gygaea soon after marrying Eurydice, because Gygaea's children made no attempt to claim the throne before the 350s, implying that they were younger than Eurydice's children. Additionally, both Diodorus and Justin call Alexander II the eldest son of Amyntas. Through Gygaea, Amyntas had three more sons: Archelaus, Arrhidaeus, and Menelaus. Unlike Eurydice's children, none of Gygaea's sons ascended to the throne and were all killed by their half-brother Philip II.

Amyntas also adopted the Athenian general Iphicrates around 386 in recognition of his military services and marital ties with the Thracian king, Cotys I.

Lineage and accession 
Amyntas became king at a troubled time for Macedonia and the Argead dynasty. The unexpected death of his great-grandfather King Alexander I in 454 BC triggered a dynastic crisis between his five sons: Perdiccas II, Menelaus, Philip, Alcetas, and Amyntas' grandfather, Amyntas. Perdiccas would eventually emerge victorious, extinguishing the line of Philip. The elder Amyntas evidently retired to his lands at some point in the conflict and no part in the exercise of power. Archelaus, Perdiccas' son, ascended to the throne around 413 and allegedly murdered Alcetas and his son, thus eliminating that family branch as well. However, Archelaus would himself be killed, possibly murdered, in 400 or 399 by his lover Craterus. His death prompted another succession crisis, resulting in five kings ruling in less than seven years, with nearly all ending violently. As Diodorus tells us, the younger Amyntas seized the throne at this point in 393/2 after assassinating the previous king Pausanias. Following his accession, Macedonia experienced no major internal political problems for the entirety of Amyntas' reign.

King of Macedon 
Shortly after he became king in 393 or 392, he was driven out by the Illyrians, but in the following year, with the aid of the Thessalians, he recovered his kingdom. Medius, head of the house of the Aleuadae of Larissa, is believed to have provided aid to Amyntas in recovering his throne. The mutual relationship between the Argeadae and the Aleuadae dates to the time of Archelaus.

To shore up his country against the threat of the Illyrians, Amyntas established an alliance with the Chalcidian League led by Olynthus.  In exchange for this support, Amyntas granted them rights to Macedonian timber, which was sent back to Athens to help fortify their fleet. With money flowing into Olynthus from these exports, their power grew. In response, Amyntas sought additional allies. He established connections with Kotys, chief of the Odrysians. Kotys had already married his daughter to the Athenian general Iphicrates.  Prevented from marrying into Kotys' family, Amyntas soon adopted Iphicrates as his son.

After the King's Peace of 387 BC, Sparta was anxious to re-establish its presence in northern Greece. In 385 BC, Bardylis and his Illyrians attacked Epirus instigated and aided by Dionysius I of Syracuse, in an attempt to restore the Molossian king Alcetas I of Epirus to the throne. When Amyntas sought Spartan aid against the growing threat of Olynthus, the Spartans eagerly responded.  That Olynthus was backed by Athens and Thebes, rivals to Sparta for the control of Greece, provided them with an additional incentive to break up this growing power in the north. Amyntas thus concluded a treaty with the Spartans, who assisted him in a war against Olynthus.  First Spartan-Macedonian forces suffered two defeats but in 379 they managed to destroy Olynthus. He also entered into a league with Jason of Pherae, and assiduously cultivated the friendship of Athens. In 371 BC at a Panhellenic congress of the Lacedaemonian allies, he voted in support of the Athenians' claim and joined other Greeks in voting to help Athens to recover possession of Amphipolis.

With Olynthus defeated, Amyntas was now able to conclude a treaty with Athens and keep the timber revenues for himself. Amyntas shipped the timber to the house of the Athenian Timotheus, in Piraeus.

Amyntas died aged 50, leaving his throne to his eldest son, Alexander II.

See also
 Treaties between Amyntas III and the Chalcidians
 Amyntaio

Citations

External links
 Coins of Amyntas III
 Atheno-Macedonian Alliance-Translation of Epigraphy

370 BC deaths
4th-century BC Macedonian monarchs
4th-century BC rulers
Argead kings of Macedonia
Old Macedonian kingdom
Year of birth missing